Basic Leucine Zipper and W2 Domain-Containing Protein 2 is a protein that is encoded by the BZW2 gene. It is a eukaryotic translation factor found in species up to bacteria. In animals, it is localized in the cytoplasm and expressed ubiquitously throughout the body. The heart, placenta, skeletal muscle, and hippocampus show higher expression. In various cancers, upregulation tends to lead to higher severity and mortality. It has been found to interact with SARS-CoV-2.

Gene 
BZW2 is known as Basic Leucine Zipper W2 Domain-Containing Protein 2, MST017, MSTP017, 5MP1, Eukaryotic Translation Factor 5, and HSPC028. It is located on chromosome 7 at p21.1  on the plus strand. The gene spans 60,389 base pairs, at coordinates 16,583,248 – 16,804,999. There are 12 exons.

Protein 
There are two known isoforms of BZW2. Isoform 1 is 419 amino acids long and is the most abundant form. Isoform 2 is 225 amino acids, containing only 11 exons and a shorter N-terminus. 

The coded protein is 419 amino acids long and weighs 48.3 kDa. As described in the name, the protein contains a leucine-zipper motif. Four “L……” repeats are present in the beginning, giving rise to the characteristic leucine zipper helix within the 3D structure. An eIF5C domain follows the leucine motif, which is apart of proteins that are important for strict regulation of cellular processes.

The amino acid composition of BZW2 has a higher amount of lysines and a lower amount of prolines in humans but a higher glutamic acid composition in its orthologs. The human BZW2 protein has an overall charge of -3 which can go down to -9 in orthologs. There are no significant charge clusters. There is also a KELQ repeat that has remained conserved in animals. 

The secondary structure contains a majority of alpha helices. There are 19 alpha helices in all orthologs, except for two additional beta sheets which are absent in humans. The tertiary structure forms a repeated fold of alpha-helices, a structure that is conserved through bacteria.

Regulation

Gene-level 
There are three known promoters for BZW2. It is regulated by numerous transcription factors, including an estrogen receptor transcription factor (ESR2, ES3), leucine zipper transcription factor (RRFIP1), and Y sex-determining transcription factors (SRY). With these transcription factors, BZW2 has regulated expression in organs that contribute to cellular functions. The Y sex-determining transcription factor works to regulate BZW2 expression in the testis. Throughout the body, BZW2 is ubiquitously expressed within tissues. There is elevated mRNA abundance in the heart, placenta, and skeletal muscle.

Transcript-level 
There are four major stem loops in the 5’ untranslated and four in the 3’ untranslated region that function in transcript-level regulation.

Protein-level 
BZW2 has multiple phosphorylation, acetylation, glycosylation, SUMOylation, and glycation sites for regulation. Since upregulation of BZW2 leads to disrupted cellular processes and severe cancer forms, post-translational modifications are needed to keep the gene highly regulated. The protein is localized within the cytoplasm and has no likely or confirmed nuclear or mitochondrial target peptides.

Evolution 
BZW2 has a single paralog, BZW1 which is conserved up to plants. There are BZW2 orthologs up to a couple species of bacteria. The most distant ortholog was Microbacterium arborescens. BZW2 contains an eIF5C domain which is also present in eIF2BE, eIF4G, eIF5, and a GAP protein specific for eIF2.

 
Compared to Cytochrome C, a quickly diverging protein, and Fibrinogen, a slowly diverging protein, BZW2 has had slow corrected divergence over time, illustrating conservation and protein importance.

Interactions 
BZW2 is known to interact with:

 BZW1
 EIF2S2
 PSTPIP1
 NEK4
 ORF4
 SNW1
 rep
EIF2S2 and ORF4 work to synthesize and replicate BZW2. PSTPIP1 and NEK4 are regulatory proteins that help in the functionality of BZW2. SNW1, a spliceosome protein, splices BZW2 mRNA variants. The protein rep is apart of SARS-CoV-2 virus and inhibits translation of BZW2.

Clinical significance

Cancer 
BZW2 has been studied to determine its role in multiple cancers. Overall, the studies all showed that upregulation of BZW2 lead to more severe forms of cancer, higher rate of mortality, and increased likeliness of reoccurrence.

A 2019 study focused on the effect of BZW2 in colorectal cancer. It found that upregulation of BZW2 promoted tumor growth and had a downstream upregulation effect on c-Myc, a proto-oncogene. A second study from 2020 determined this upregulation also had a positive effect on the activation of the ERK/MAPK pathway. 

In hepatocellular carcinoma, osteosarcoma, lung adenocarcinoma, and muscle-invasive bladder cancer, overexpression of BZW2 lead to overactivation of the AKT/mTOR signaling pathway by increasing phosphorylation of AKT and mTOR. The AKT/mTOR pathway is an important intracellular signaling pathway that regulates the cell cycle. When the pathway activity is increased, cells proliferated at a higher rate and apoptosis decreases, leading to tumor growth.

SARS-CoV-2 
BZW2 interacts with the nsp8 protein of SARS-CoV-2. nsp8 dimerizes and forms a supercomplex which works to repress the translation of BZW2.

References

Further reading

External links 
 

Proteins